Photon factory films private limited is an India-based movie production studio/distribution/media and entertainment company along with its sub-brand "FADE IN" advertisements and events management pvt.ltd. founded by B. Venktesan Yadav.

Photon factory started with 2001's Tamil movie "Minnale", later on the company also co-produced movies like "Kaakha Kaakha" and "Vettaiyaadu Vilaiyaadu".

Fade in Advertisements 

Fade in "advertisements" private limited includes past clients such as "Pepsi-Co", "Hyundai", "Mc Dowells", "Hindustan Limited", "Cavin kare", "Coca-Cola", "Parrys confectionery", "Jet airways", "Sony India", "TVS motors", "Aircel", "Sutherland Global services".

Filmography

Production

Distribution

References 

 http://www.screenindia.com/news/photon-factory-acquires-kalavani-remake-rights/655542/
 http://www.oshothemovie.com/
 http://www.oshonews.com/2011/08/osho-the-movie-is-go/

Film production companies based in Chennai
Film distributors of India
Entertainment companies established in 2001
Indian companies established in 2001
2001 establishments in Tamil Nadu